Michael Rankin (born 3 December 1960) is a former Scottish footballer who played for Dumbarton.

References

1960 births
Scottish footballers
Dumbarton F.C. players
Scottish Football League players
Living people
Port Glasgow F.C. players
Association football midfielders